Ahern Glacier may refer to:

 Ahern Glacier (Antarctica) on the continent of Antarctica
 Ahern Glacier (Montana) in Glacier National Park, Montana, USA